Kelvin Banks Jr. is an American football offensive tackle who currently plays for the Texas Longhorns.

Early life and high school
Banks grew up in Humble, Texas and attended Summer Creek High School. Banks was rated a five-star recruit and initially committed to play college football at Oregon over offers from Texas, LSU, Texas A&M, and Oklahoma State. He later decommitted after Oregon head coach Mario Cristobal left the program. Banks later signed to play at Texas.

College career
Banks enrolled at Texas in July 2022. He was named the Longhorns' starting left tackle entering his freshman season Banks was named a semifinalist for the Shaun Alexander Award.

References

External links
Texas Longhorns bio

Living people
American football offensive tackles
Players of American football from Texas
Texas Longhorns football players
Year of birth missing (living people)
People from Humble, Texas